Ludovic Chammartin (born 31 January 1985) is a Swiss judoka who competes in the men's 60 kg category. At the 2012 Summer Olympics, he was defeated in the second round. At the 2016 Summer Olympics, he was eliminated in the third round by Diyorbek Urozboev.

References

External links

 

Swiss male judoka
1985 births
Living people
Olympic judoka of Switzerland
Judoka at the 2012 Summer Olympics
Judoka at the 2016 Summer Olympics
Place of birth missing (living people)
Judoka at the 2015 European Games
European Games medalists in judo
European Games bronze medalists for Switzerland
21st-century Swiss people